Mureșan is a Romanian language surname. The name means "person from Mureș".  Mureș is a county of Romania .

With the name include:

Andrei Mureșan (born 1985), Romanian footballer
Gabriel Mureșan (born 1982), Romanian footballer
Gheorghe Mureșan (born 1971), Romanian basketball player, noted for being the tallest player in NBA history
Lucian Mureșan (born 1931), Romanian major archbishop and cardinal of the Catholic Church
Mircea Mureșan (born 1928), Romanian film director
Robert Mureșan (born 1991), Romanian motorcycle racer
Sever Mureșan (born 1948), Romanian tennis player

See also
Mureșanu

Romanian-language surnames